Witold Łokuciewski (2 February 1917 – 17 April 1990) was a Polish fighter ace of the Polish Air Force in World War II who was given the nickname Tolo.

Early life and time in the Polish Air Force 

He was born to Antoni Łokuciewski in Novocherkassk in the Russian Empire. His family moved to Vilnius in 1918. He then graduated from high school Jan Śniadecki in Oszmiana and gained his high school diploma in 1935. He then began studying at the Polish Air Force University in Dęblin. After his graduation in 1938 he was assigned to the 112 Fighter Squadron of the 1st Air Regiment located in Warsaw, Poland. As a part of the unit he fought in the defense of Warsaw in 1939 using a PZL P.11 plane. After the invasion of Poland by the USSR he along with the 112 Fighter Squadron escaped into Romania.

Time in the French Air Force 
During the Battle of France Witold Łokuciewski fought in France starting from 17 May 1940 in a MS 406 fighter aircraft for the Polish air force established in France. He continued to fight for the French people until a radio call from the French Prime Minister, Philippe Pétain called for a ceasefire on 18 June when his Squadron ended flights. Later being evacuated to Great Britain on 21 June and being given the service number P1492.

Time in the Royal Air Force 
On 2 August 1940 he became a pilot in the 303 Squadron a Polish lead squadron fighting for Great Britain being a part of the Royal Air Force and began flying missions shortly after. On 20 November 1941 he was given command over a squadron in the 303 Squadron. Łokuciewski saw considerable action through 1940–41. His pseudonym was "Tolo".

During a mission taking place over German occupied France on 13 March 1942 his plane became damaged and forced him into an emergency landing. After landing Witold was imprisoned by the Germans and was taken to Stalag Luft III located in Żagań. During his time in the camp he took part of The Great Escape in 1944. He managed to escape along with 25 other prisoners. He was recaptured a few days later he was caught again by Germans in Legnica.

During May 1945 as the war was ending he was liberated and taken back to England. He was reassigned to 303 Squadron on 29 November 1945. He became commanding officer of No. 303 Squadron in February 1946, until the unit disbanded in December. He was credited with 9 (and 1 shared) kills, and 4 probable kills which enabled him to get the "fighter ace"title. The title derives from World War I, and was given in the French air force to pilots who shot down five enemy's planes. During World War II, it got adopted by the American air force and unofficially - by the Polish air force in the west.

Return to Poland and later life 
When he returned to Poland in 1947 he was imprisoned by the Communist authorities, and on release worked as a taxi driver in Warsaw. He joined the Polish Air Force in 1956 after being accepted into military aviation, rising to a senior rank. In 1969–71 he was the Polish military attaché in London. He retired in 1974 and in 1985 was appointed to the Presidium in the Society of Fighters for Freedom and Democracy. Later he became a member in the Council for the Protection of Struggle and Martydom Sites from 1988 to 1990

On 11 November 1988 he became a member of the Honorary Committee of Commemoration during the 70th anniversary of National Independence Day of Poland. In 1989 he stood as a parliamentary candidate to the Sejm (lower house) in the first post-communist elections. And was given an entry in the honorary book of soldiers by Minister of National Defense, General Florian Siwicki. In 1989, nearly half a century after the war, when asked what does a fighter feel like while attacking an enemy, Witold replied: "if it's a rather large attack - firstly fear while going through a fire avalanche, then determination and lastly, if enemy gets shot and is coming down in a panache of smoke and fire - great massive satisfaction".

He died on 17 April 1990 and was buried at the Powązki Military Cemetery in Powązki, Warsaw.

List of kills 
Witold Łokuciewski was put on Bajan's list in the 20th position with 8 reliable plane kills and 4 probable kills. These are as follows:

Reliable plane kills 
 He 111 on 10 June 1940 while piloting a MS-406
 Do 215 on 7 September 1940 while piloting a Hurricane Mk. I
 Bf 109 on 11 September 1940 while piloting a Hurricane Mk I
 Do 215 on 11 September 1940 while piloting a Hurricane Mk I
 Bf 109 on 15 September 1940 while piloting a Hurricane Mk I
 Bf 109 on 20 April 1941 while piloting a Spitfire Mk IIA
 Bf 109 on 18 June 1941 while piloting a Spitfire Mk IIA
 Bf 109 on 22 June 1941 while piloting a Spitfire Mk IIB

Possible plane kills 
 Ju 87 on 6 September 1939 he heavily damaged the plane while piloting a P 11c
 Do 215 on 7 September 1940 while piloting a Hurricane Mk 1
 Bf 109 on 22 June 1941 while piloting a Spitfire Mk IIB
 Bf 109 on 11 July 1941 while piloting a Spitfire Mk IIB

Awards 
  Virtuti Militari, Silver Cross
  Cross of Valour (Poland), three times
  Polonia Restituta, Knight's Cross
  Polonia Restituta, Commander's Cross
  Distinguished Flying Cross (United Kingdom)
  Croix de Guerre (France)

References

Further reading
 Tadeusz Jerzy Krzystek, Anna Krzystek: Polskie Siły Powietrzne w Wielkiej Brytanii w latach 1940-1947 łącznie z Pomocniczą Lotniczą Służbą Kobiet (PLSK-WAAF). Sandomierz: Stratus, 2012, s. 355. 
 Jerzy Pawlak: Absolwenci Szkoły Orląt: 1925-1939. Warszawa: Retro-Art, 2009, s. 182. 
 Piotr Sikora: Asy polskiego lotnictwa. Warszawa: Oficyna Wydawnicza Alma-Press. 2014, s. 267-271. 
 Józef Zieliński: Asy polskiego lotnictwa. Warszawa: Agencja lotnicza ALTAIR, 1994, s. 30-31.
 Józef Zieliński: Lotnicy polscy w Bitwie o Wielką Brytanię. Warszawa: Oficyna Wydawnicza MH, 2005, s. 115-116.

External links 

1917 births
1990 deaths
People from Novocherkassk
Recipients of the Croix de Guerre 1939–1945 (France)
Polish prisoners of war
Polish World War II flying aces
Recipients of the Distinguished Flying Cross (United Kingdom)
Commanders of the Order of Polonia Restituta
Recipients of the Silver Cross of the Virtuti Militari
Recipients of the Cross of Valour (Poland)
World War II prisoners of war held by Germany
Polish People's Army personnel
Royal Air Force pilots of World War II
Polish Royal Air Force pilots of World War II
The Few
Polish taxi drivers
Polish military attachés
Soviet emigrants to Poland